Sedam railway station,  (also known as Seram railway station), (station code: SEM) is an Indian Railway station in Sedam the town of Kalaburagi District  in Indian state of Karnataka. It is located on the –Wadi line of Secunderabad railway division in South Central Railway zone.

History 
The Wadi–Secunderabad line was built in 1874 with financing by the Nizam of Hyderabad. It later became part of Nizam's Guaranteed State Railway

Structure and expansion 
Sedam railway station has two platforms and four tracks each running to 650 meter in length, a general and reservation booking office, shelters, lighting, benches, parking, foot overbridge, waiting room and toilet facility.

References

External links

Secunderabad railway division
Railway stations in Kalaburagi district
Railway stations in Karnataka